Events from the year 1781 in art.

Events
 August 27 – Danish artists Marie Jeanne Crevoisier and Johan Frederik Clemens are married.

Works

 George Barret, Sr. – View of Windermere Lake, Early Morning
 Jacques-Louis David – Belisarius begging for alms
 Philip James de Loutherbourg – Eidophusikon
 Henry Fuseli – The Nightmare
 Thomas Gainsborough – Mrs Robinson as Perdita
 Anton Graff – Frederick the Great, King of Prussia
 Jean-Antoine Houdon – Portrait busts of Voltaire and Molière
 Sir Joshua Reynolds
 Emily Potts as Thaïs (Waddesdon Manor, Buckinghamshire)
 George, 2nd Earl Harcourt, his wife Elizabeth and his brother William (Ashmolean Museum, Oxford)
 George Romney
 Ann Bowes
 The Charteris Children
 Joseph Wright of Derby – Sir Brooke Boothby

Births
 March (probable) – John Burnet, Scottish engraver and painter (died 1868)
 March 13 – Karl Friedrich Schinkel, Prussian architect and painter (died 1841)
 March 20 – Joseph Paelinck, Belgian painter (died 1839)
 April 7 – Francis Leggatt Chantrey, English sculptor of the Georgian era (died 1841)
 April 8 – Luke Clennell, English engraver and painter (died 1840)
 April 22 – José de Madrazo y Agudo, Spanish Neoclassic painter (died 1859)
 July 25 – Merry-Joseph Blondel, French neo-classic painter (died 1853)
 October 12 – William Westall, English landscape painter (died 1850)
 November 1 – Joseph Stieler, German painter (died 1858)
 November 11 – Caroline Bardua, German painter (died 1864)
 November 21 – Cornelius Varley, English watercolor painter (died 1873)
 date unknown
 Étienne-Jean Delécluze, French painter and critic (died 1863)
 Thomas Douglas Guest, British portrait painter (died 1845)
 Francis Hervé, French-born British painter (died 1850)
 Kikuchi Yōsai – Japanese painter most famous for his monochrome portraits of historical figures (died 1878)
 probable – John Wesley Jarvis, American painter (died 1839)

Deaths
 January 15 – Sir Henry Cheere, 1st Baronet, English sculptor (born 1703)
 February 22 – Giovanni Maria Morlaiter, Italian Rococo sculptor (born 1699)
 March 2 – Francisco Salzillo, Spanish sculptor (born 1707)
 April 10 – Teodor Kračun, Serbian painter (born 1730)
 June 5 – Noël Hallé, French painter, draftsman and printmaker (born 1711)
 September 12 – Peter Scheemakers, Flemish Roman Catholic sculptor (born 1691)
 September 30 – Jean-Baptiste Le Prince, French etcher and painter (born 1734)
 October 22 – Johann August Nahl, German sculptor and stucco artist (born 1710)
 November 3 – Jakob Emanuel Handmann, Swiss painter (born 1718)
 November 12 – Jean Grandjean, Dutch painter, draftsman, and watercolourist (born 1752)
 date unknown
 Etienne Aubry, French painter of primarily portraits and genre subjects (born 1746)
 Jean-Bernard, abbé Le Blanc, French art critic and director of the official French policy in the arts (born 1707)
 Francesco Caccianiga, Italian painter and engraver (born 1700)
 Carlo Costanzi, Italian gem engraver of the late-Baroque period (born 1705)
 Jacques-Ignace de La Touche, French painter of miniatures and portraits (born 1694)
 Ubaldo Gandolfi, Italian painter (born 1728)

 
Years of the 18th century in art
1780s in art